The 1999 Waldbaum's Hamlet Cup was a men's tennis tournament played on Hard courts in Long Island, United that was part of the International Series of the 1998 ATP Tour. It was the nineteenth edition of the tournament and was held from 23–29 August 1999.

Finals

Singles

 Magnus Norman defeated  Àlex Corretja, 7–6(7–4), 4–6, 6–3

Doubles

 Olivier Delaître /  Fabrice Santoro defeated  Jan-Michael Gambill /  Scott Humphries, 7–5, 6–4

References

 
Waldbaum's Hamlet Cup
1999